The 2015 Bilderberg Conference took place between 11 and 14 June 2015 at the Interalpen-Hotel Tyrol in Telfs-Buchen, Austria. The hotel had previously held the Bilderberg Conference in 1988.

The 41st G7 summit took place the week before the conference, and was held at the Schloss Elmau, sixteen miles away near Garmisch-Partenkirchen, in Bavaria, Germany.

Agenda
A list of key topics for discussion at the 2015 Bilderberg conference was published on the Bilderberg website shortly before the meeting. Topics for discussion included:

 Artificial intelligence
 Cybersecurity
 Chemical weapons threats
 Current economic issues
 European strategy
 Globalisation
 Greece
 Iran
 Middle East
 NATO
 Russia
 Terrorism
 United Kingdom
 USA
 US elections

Delegates (alphabetical)
A list of expected delegates was published by the Bilderberg Group.

Paul Achleitner, 
Marcus Agius, non-executive chairman, PA Consulting Group
Thomas Ahrenkiel, director of the Danish Intelligence Service (DDIS)
John R. Allen, special presidential envoy for the Global Coalition to Counter ISIL, United States Department of State
Roger Altman, executive chairman, Evercore Partners
Anne Applebaum, director of Transitions Forum, Legatum Institute
Matti Apunen, director, Finnish Business and Policy Forum
Zoë Baird, CEO and president, Markle Foundation
Ed Balls, former Shadow Chancellor of the Exchequer
Francisco Pinto Balsemão, chairman, Impresa SGPS
José Manuel Barroso, former President of the European Commission
Nicolas Baverez, partner, Gibson, Dunn & Crutcher 
René Benko, founder, Signa Holding 
Franco Bernabè, chairman, FB Group
Ben van Beurden, CEO, Royal Dutch Shell
Laurent Bigorgne, director, Institut Montaigne
Laurence Boone, special adviser on financial and economic affairs to the president
Ana Patricia Botín, chairman, Banco Santander
Svein Richard Brandtzaeg, president and CEO, Norsk Hydro
Oscar Bronner, publisher, Der Standard
William J. Burns, president, Carnegie Endowment for International Peace
Patrick Calvar, director general, DGSI
Henri de Castries, chairman, Bilderberg Meetings; chairman and CEO, Axa Group
Juan Luis Cebrián, executive chairman, PRISA
W. Edmund Clark, retired executive, TD Bank Group
Benoît Coeuré, member of the executive board, European Central Bank
Andrew Coyne, editor, editorials and comment, National Post
Mikael L. Damberg, minister for enterprise and innovation
Karel De Gucht, former EU trade commissioner, state minister
Thomas E. Donilon, former U.S. national security advisor; partner and vice chair, O'Melveny & Myers LLP
Mathias Döpfner, CEO, Axel Springer SE
Ann Dowling, president, Royal Academy of Engineering
Regina Dugan, vice president for engineering, advanced technology and projects, Google
Trine Eilertsen, political editor, Aftenposten
Merete Eldrup, CEO,  TV 2 Danmark A/S
John Elkann, chairman and CEO,  EXOR; chairman, Fiat Chrysler Automobiles
Thomas Enders, CEO, Airbus Group
Mary Erdoes, CEO, JP Morgan Asset Management
Rona Fairhead, chairman, BBC Trust
Ulrik Federspiel, executive vice president, Haldor Topsøe A/S
Martin Feldstein, president emeritus, NBER;  professor of economics, Harvard University
Heinz Fischer, federal president
Douglas Flint, group chairman, HSBC Holdings plc
Christoph Franz, chairman of the board, F. Hoffmann-La Roche Ltd
Louise Fresco, president and chairman of executive board, Wageningen University and Research Centre
Kenneth C. Griffin, founder and CEO, Citadel Investment Group, LLC
Lilli Gruber, executive editor and anchor Otto e mezzo, La7 TV
Sergei Guriev, professor of economics, Sciences Po
Gönenç Gürkaynak, managing partner, ELIG Law Firm
Alfred Gusenbauer, former chancellor of the Republic of Austria
Victor Halberstadt, professor of economics, Leiden University
Erich Hampel, chairman, UniCredit Bank Austria AG
Demis Hassabis, vice president of engineering, Google DeepMind
Wolfgang Hesoun, CEO, Siemens Austria
Philipp Hildebrand, vice chairman, BlackRock Inc.
Reid Hoffman, co-founder and executive chairman, LinkedIn
Wolfgang Ischinger, chairman, Munich Security Conference
Kenneth M. Jacobs, chairman and CEO, Lazard
Julia Jäkel, CEO, Gruner + Jahr
James A. Johnson, chairman, Johnson Capital Partners
Alain Juppé, mayor of Bordeaux, former prime minister
Joe Kaeser, president and CEO, Siemens AG
Alex Karp, CEO, Palantir Technologies
Gilles Kepel, university professor, Sciences Po
John Kerr, deputy chairman, Scottish Power
Ilhan Kesici, MP, Turkish Parliament
Henry Kissinger, chairman, Kissinger Associates, Inc.
Klaus Kleinfeld, chairman and CEO, Alcoa
Klaas Knot, president, De Nederlandsche Bank
 Mustafa Vehbi Koç, chairman, Koç Holding A.S.
Henry Kravis, co-chairman and Co-CEO, Kohlberg Kravis Roberts & Co.
Marie-Josée Kravis, senior fellow and vice chair, Hudson Institute
André Kudelski, chairman and CEO, Kudelski Group
Kurt Lauk, president, Globe Capital Partners
Carola Lemne, CEO, The Confederation of Swedish Enterprise
Stuart Levey, chief legal officer, HSBC Holdings plc
Ursula von der Leyen, minister of defence
Thomas Leysen, chairman of the board of directors, KBC Group
Shiraz Maher, senior research fellow, ICSR, King's College London
Christina Markus Lassen, head of department, Ministry of Foreign Affairs, Security Policy and Stabilisation
Jessica Mathews, Distinguished Fellow, Carnegie Endowment for International Peace
James Mattis, Distinguished Visiting Fellow, Hoover Institution, Stanford University
Pierre Maudet, vice-president of the State Council, Department of Security, Police and the Economy of Geneva
David I. McKay, president and CEO, Royal Bank of Canada
Nuray Mert, columnist, professor of political science, Istanbul University
Jim Messina, CEO, The Messina Group
Charles Michel, prime minister
John Micklethwait, editor-in-chief, Bloomberg LP
Zanny Minton Beddoes, editor-in-chief, The Economist
Mario Monti, senator-for-life; president, Bocconi University
Leena Mörttinen, executive director, The Finnish Family Firms Association
Craig Mundie, principal, Mundie & Associates
Heather Munroe-Blum, chairperson, Canada Pension Plan Investment Board
Beatrix of the Netherlands
Michael O'Leary, CEO, Ryanair Plc
George Osborne, First Secretary of State and Chancellor of the Exchequer
Soli Özel, columnist, Haberturk Newspaper; senior lecturer, Kadir Has University
Dimitri Papalexopoulos, group CEO, Titan Cement Co.
Catherine Pégard, president, Public Establishment of the Palace, Museum and National Estate of Versailles
Richard Perle, resident fellow, American Enterprise Institute
David Petraeus, chairman, KKR Global Institute
Panagiotis Pikrammenos, honorary president of The Hellenic Council of State
Heather Reisman, chair and CEO, Indigo Books & Music Inc.
Gianfelice Rocca, chairman, Techint Group
Gerhard Roiss, CEO, OMV Austria
Robert Rubin, co chair, Council on Foreign Relations; former secretary of the Treasury
Mark Rutte, prime minister
Karim Sadjadpour, senior associate, Carnegie Endowment for International Peace
John Sawers, chairman and partner, Macro Advisory Partners
Selin Sayek Böke, vice president, Republican People's Party
Eric Schmidt, executive chairman, Google Inc.
Rudolf Scholten, CEO, Oesterreichische Kontrollbank AG
Karl Sevelda, CEO, Raiffeisen Bank International AG
Jens Stoltenberg, secretary general, NATO
Alexander Stubb, minister of finance
Katrin Suder, deputy minister of defense
Peter Sutherland, UN special representative; chairman, Goldman Sachs International
Carl-Henric Svanberg, chairman, BP plc; chairman, AB Volvo
Olaug Svarva, CEO, The Government Pension Fund Norway
Peter Thiel, president, Thiel Capital
Loukas Tsoukalis, president, Hellenic Foundation for European and Foreign Policy
Ahmet Üzümcü, director-general, Organisation for the Prohibition of Chemical Weapons
António M. Vitorino, partner, Cuetrecasas, Concalves Pereira, RL
Jacob Wallenberg, chairman, Investor AB
Vin Weber, partner, Mercury LLC
Martin H. Wolf, chief economics commentator, The Financial Times
James Wolfensohn, chairman and CEO, Wolfensohn and Company
Robert Zoellick, chairman, board of international advisors, The Goldman Sachs Group

References

External links

2015 conferences
2015 in Austria
B
2015